Laccornis oblongus is a species of beetle belonging to the family Dytiscidae.

It is native to Northern Europe.

References

Dytiscidae